Ian Phares Pearson (born 5 April 1959) is a British Labour Party politician who was a member of parliament (MP) from 1994 until 2010, representing Dudley West from 1994 until 1997, and then Dudley South from 1997 until his retirement from the House of Commons at the 2010 general election. He served as Economic Secretary to the Treasury from 2008 to 2010.

Early life
Pearson was educated at Brierley Hill Grammar School and Balliol College, Oxford (BA Philosophy, Politics, and Economics) and the University of Warwick (MA, PhD).

Political career
Having unsuccessfully contested Bexhill and Battle in the 1983 general election, Pearson entered parliament for Dudley West in a by-election in December 1994, winning a Conservative seat left vacant by the death of John Blackburn in October of that year. He won the seat with nearly 70% of the votes, with the Conservative candidate receiving less than 20%.

Boundary changes created the new constituency of Dudley South in 1997 which he then represented.

Pearson was Parliamentary Private Secretary to the Paymaster-General Geoffrey Robinson from 1997 until Robinson resigned in 1998. In 2001 he returned to the government as a whip. In 2002 he moved to the Northern Ireland Office as a Parliamentary Under-Secretary of State. After the 2005 general election he was promoted to Minister of State for Trade in the Foreign and Commonwealth Office.

In the PM's 2006 reshuffle, he was appointed as Minister of State for Climate Change and Environment at the Department for Environment, Food and Rural Affairs.

In an interview with The Guardian published on 5 January 2007, Pearson courted considerable controversy by publicly criticising several airlines, particularly Ryanair, for failing to pull their weight in lowering UK carbon emissions. He described Ryanair as "the irresponsible face of capitalism". In response, Michael O'Leary, the CEO of Ryanair, claimed Ryanair had made a considerable investment in environmentally friendly planes and technologies and had the lowest fuel use per passenger figures of any British airline. O'Leary described Pearson as "silly", adding that Pearson "hadn't a clue what he [was] talking about".

On 29 June 2007, Pearson was moved in Gordon Brown's first reshuffle to become a Minister of State in the newly created Department for Innovation, Universities and Skills under Secretary of State John Denham. Whilst there he was criticised for not doing anything to avert a funding crisis at the Science and Technology Facilities Council hitting UK Astronomy and particle physics. In Gordon Brown's next reshuffle of 3 October 2008, Pearson was moved to the Treasury as Economic Secretary, also becoming Parliamentary Under-Secretary of State for Economics and Business. In the June 2009 reshuffle Pearson retained his role at the Treasury but lost his business role as the department was merged to create the Department for Business, Innovation and Skills.

On 21 January 2010, Pearson announced that he would not contest the next general election.

Pearson is a non-executive chairman of EQTEC PLC, an Irish multinational gasification company rolling out successful technology in several countries.

References

External links
Official website
Ministerial Responsibilities – Department for Innovation, Universities and Skills
Guardian Unlimited Politics – Ask Aristotle: Ian Pearson MP
Ian Pearson MP on TheyWorkForYou
Kaupthing Involvement 

Interview with Ian Pearson on his science responsibilities. Published in Research Fortnight, July 2007

1959 births
Living people
Labour Party (UK) MPs for English constituencies
UK MPs 1992–1997
UK MPs 1997–2001
UK MPs 2001–2005
UK MPs 2005–2010
Northern Ireland Office junior ministers
Alumni of Balliol College, Oxford
Alumni of the University of Warwick